The Budapest Fringe Festival is an annual event held every spring in Budapest, Hungary. It is a fringe festival, on the model of the Edinburgh Festival Fringe. The Budapest Fringe Festival was first held in 2006. The festival brings more than 500 artists in about 50 shows to produce a wide range of interesting works in alternative theatre, dance, music and comedy outside the mainstream.

History
The Budapest Fringe Festival was first held between 31 March and 2 April in 2006 in seven different locations in the centre of the Hungarian capital, Budapest.

Previous years

References

External links
 

Theatre festivals in Hungary
Events in Budapest
Fringe festivals
Festivals in Hungary
Tourist attractions in Budapest
2006 establishments in Hungary
Recurring events established in 2006
Annual events in Hungary
Spring (season) events in Hungary